Frederiksberg Gymnasium is an upper secondary school (Danish gymnasium) in the Frederiksberg district of Copenhagen, Denmark. Its current building, located just off Falkoner Allé, was inaugurated in 2004 to a design by Henning Larsen Architects. The school has 650 students.

History
Originally a private boys school, the school was founded in 1879 as Villakvarterets Forberedelses- og Realskole. Already the next year changed its name to Frederiksberg Latin- og Realskole and then again in 1907 to Frederiksberg Gymnasium. Frederiksberg Municipality took over the school in 1917 and in 1946 it was opened to female students.

The school moved to Niels Ebbesens Vej and in 2004 it moved into its current building at Falkoner Plads.

Building
The school is located at an urban space which was created as part of the City's plan for the area around Frederiksberg Metro Station.
Fifty metres wide and three storeys tall, the glazed front opens to the school's assembly hall from where wide staircases give access to the basement and two upper floor. The two top floors offer a flexible teaching environment with a mixture of open and more closed rooms and visual contact across corridors and interior garden spaces. There are terraces facing the interior courtyard. The basement contains gyms and flex rooms.

Prominent alumni 
 1895: Holger Scheuermann, surgeon
 1900: Kristian Middelboe, footballer
 1905: Nils Middelboe, footballer
 1907: Axel Salto, ceramist
 1910: Frode Lund Hvalkof, officer and World War II resistance fighter
 1916: Henry Skjær, opera singer
 1927: Palle Lauring, writer and historian
 1931: Haldor Topsøe, civil engineer and founder of Haldor Topsøe A/S
 1932: Sejr Volmer-Sørensen, actor
 1941: Erik Koch Michelsen, World War II resistance fighter
 1947: Bent Melchior, Chief Rabbi
 1948: Bent Rold Andersen, politician
 1949: Uffe Harder, writer
 1950: Erling Oxdam, politician
 1955: Christian U. Jensen, mathematician
 1961: Per Stig Møller, politician
 1964: Mogens Lykketoft, politician
 1968: Roald Als, caricaturist
 1970: Søren Rislund, comedian
 1970: Jan Monrad, comedian
 1976: Peter Høeg, writer
 1986: Mads Lebech, mayor
 2006: Freja Beha Erichsen, model

References

External links
 Official website

Gymnasiums in Copenhagen
Educational institutions established in 1879
Buildings and structures completed in 2004
1879 establishments in Denmark